This article lists events that occurred during 1923 in Estonia.

Incumbents

Events
Pääsküla-Tallinn electric railway begins operating.

Births

Deaths

References

 
1920s in Estonia
Estonia
Estonia
Years of the 20th century in Estonia